Jesse Jackson House is a historic home located near Kinston, Lenoir County, North Carolina. It was built about 1840, and is a two-story, five bay, Greek Revival style frame dwelling. It has a gable roof, sits on a brick foundation, and has flanking concave shouldered chimneys.  The front facade features a one-story porch featuring a diminutive entablature supported by wooden pillars.

It was listed on the National Register of Historic Places in 1971.

References

Houses on the National Register of Historic Places in North Carolina
Greek Revival houses in North Carolina
Houses completed in 1840
Houses in Lenoir County, North Carolina
National Register of Historic Places in Lenoir County, North Carolina
1840 establishments in North Carolina